Ispas is a locality in Alberta, Canada.

The community was named after Ispas, Bukovina, the ancestral home of an early postmaster.

References 

Localities in the County of Two Hills No. 21